Felipe Galarza Sánchez (3 March 1913 – 3 May 1994) was a Spanish military officer who served as Chief of the Defence High Command , and as President of the Board of Joint Chiefs of Staff  between 1977 and 1978. The offices he held made him chief of staff of the Spanish Armed Forces at the time.

References

1913 births
1994 deaths
People from Asturias
People from Gijón
20th-century Spanish military personnel
Spanish lieutenant generals